Alumni Coliseum is a multi-use sports arena located on the campus of Eastern Kentucky University in Richmond, Kentucky.

History
Built in 1963, the Paul S. McBrayer Arena located inside Alumni Coliseum, is capable of seating around 6,500 people in both chairback seats and on wooden benches (8,000 for concerts) arranged in a horseshoe shape, facing a wall at the right side of the arena where staging is usually set up for events. The arena's ceiling is made completely of wooden beams and is believed to be the largest of its kind in existence. It was named for the former EKU Men's Basketball Coach Paul McBrayer who compiled a record of 219-144. The floor graphics were updated for the 2005-06 seasons and the banners were redone to be more unified. The building replaced Weaver Gymnasium, which had been home to the Colonels since 1930.

Usage
The arena is home to the Eastern Kentucky Colonels men's and women's basketball team, and the women's volleyball team.  In addition to university sponsored athletics Alumni Coliseum has also played host to a variety of other sporting events, including the All "A" Classic High School basketball tournament, KHSAA Region 5 Swimming and Diving Championships, and continues to host the Special Olympics Kentucky Summer Games.

The arena has also hosted numerous musical performers over the years, more recently including 3 Doors Down, O.A.R. (Of A Revolution), Diamond Rio, They Might be Giants, Nappy Roots and The Black Eyed Peas. It also hosted the Ohio Valley Conference men's basketball tournament in 1979.

The Donald Combs Natatorium, located behind the basketball arena, is the former home of the university's swimming and diving team and is now used predominantly for EKU recreation and the Model Laboratory School Swim team.  The natatorium houses a 6 lane 25 yard swimming pool as well as one and three meter diving boards.

The Alumni Coliseum also houses four other basketball courts in an auxiliary gymnasium, an outdoor swimming pool, eight classrooms, the Chad Bratzke Student Academic Athletic Success Center, and 20 additional offices.

See also
 List of NCAA Division I basketball arenas

References

College basketball venues in the United States
Eastern Kentucky Colonels
Basketball venues in Kentucky
Buildings and structures in Madison County, Kentucky
1963 establishments in Kentucky
Sports venues completed in 1963